The Megarian Treasury at Olympia, was an ancient Greek building, located in the sanctuary of Olympia, which held votive offerings of the Greek city-state of Megara.

See also
 Treasuries at Olympia
 Megarian Treasury (Delphi)

Notes

References
 Pausanias, Pausanias Description of Greece with an English Translation by W.H.S. Jones, Litt.D., and H.A. Ormerod, M.A., in 4 Volumes. Cambridge, Massachusetts, Harvard University Press; London, William Heinemann Ltd. 1918. Online version at the Perseus Digital Library.
 Frazer, J. G., Pausanias's Description of Greece. Translated with a Commentary by J. G. Frazer. Vol IV. Commentary on Books VI-VIII, Macmillan, 1898. Internet Archive.

External links

 Classical Monvments

Ancient Greek buildings and structures
Ancient Olympia